Prosjek (Prnjavor)  is a village in the municipality of Prnjavor Republika Srpska, Bosnia and Herzegovina.

References

Villages in Republika Srpska